Red snapper is a common name of several fish species. It may refer to:

 Several species from the genus Lutjanus:
 Lutjanus campechanus, Northern red snapper, commonly referred to as red snapper in the Gulf of Mexico and western Atlantic Ocean
 Lutjanus purpureus, Southern red snapper, is one of several Lutjanus species called red snapper (or by the name huachinango in Mexico) or Pargo in South America
 Red snappers from Southeast Asian waters may be Lutjanus species such as Lutjanus argentimaculatus, Lutjanus gibbus, Lutjanus malabaricus and Lutjanus sebae
 Several species from the genus Sebastes:
 Sebastes miniatus
 Sebastes ruberrimus, commonly referred to as red snapper along the Pacific coast of North America
 Several species from the genus Centroberyx:
 Centroberyx affinis, commonly referred to as red snapper in New Zealand
 Centroberyx gerrardi, one of several species commonly referred to as red snapper in Australia
 Etelis coruscans, long tail red snapper, commonly referred to as onaga in Hawaii
 Pagrus major, referred to as red snapper in English in contexts concerning Japanese regional cuisine

References 

Fish common names
Former disambiguation pages converted to set index articles